Lollia Paulina, also known as Lollia Paullina ( - 49 AD) was a Roman empress for six months in 38 as the third wife and consort of the Roman emperor Caligula.

Family background and early life
Paulina was a member of the plebeian gens Lollia. Paulina was the second daughter of Marcus Lollius with Volusia Saturnina, while her elder sister was Lollia Saturnina.

Her father, Marcus Lollius was the son born to the Roman politician and military officer Marcus Lollius from his wife Aurelia. Aurelia was the adoptive sister of Marcus Aurelius Cotta Maximus Messalinus. Her possible paternal uncle may have been Publius Lollius Maximus, however this is unclear and he was at least a close relation.

Paulina was born and raised in Rome and became very wealthy after inheriting the estates of her relatives. She inherited the large fortune from her paternal grandfather, thus was the heiress of Marcus Lollius.

Marriages and rivals
The first husband of Paulina was Publius Memmius Regulus, a man of consular rank, who served as a suffect consul in 31 and later, as a Roman Governor. Tacitus describes him as a man of 'dignity, who was a person of influence and good name', who died in 62.

In 38, Paulina was with Regulus at the province he was governing when Caligula ordered her to leave her husband upon overhearing a remark about the beauty of her grandmother. She was forced to divorce Regulus and marry Caligula, becoming his third wife and Roman Empress that same year. Caligula divorced her after six months of marriage, ostensibly because she was infertile, and forbade her to sleep with or associate with another man.

In 48, Paulina became a rival to the sister of Caligula, Agrippina the Younger. Paulina was considered as a choice as the fourth wife of the paternal uncle of Caligula, the Roman emperor Claudius, following the death of the third wife of Claudius, the Roman empress Valeria Messalina. In 49, Agrippina the Younger married Claudius. Sometime after, Agrippina the Younger had Paulina charged with sorcery, accused of having entered into forbidden consultations with astrologers. Without a hearing, the property of Paulina (including her gardens) was confiscated and she was sent into exile. Tacitus reported that Paulina was forced to commit suicide under the watch of a colonel of the Guards and implied that this was done under the orders of Agrippina the Younger. A sepulchre was not erected in her honor until the reign of the Roman emperor Nero.

Reputation
Paulina is mentioned in Natural History by Pliny the Elder. Pliny the Elder mentions Paulina as an example of Roman ostentation for wearing a large share of her inheritance to a dinner party in the form of jewellery worth to the value of 50 million sesterces. She would wear her jewels in her hair, round her neck, arms and fingers. The complaint of Pliny the Elder was made in the context of Rome spending enormous amounts for importing Ancient India's 'useless' pepper and pearls, as worn by Paulina even around her shoes.

In fiction
Paulina is a character in the novel series, I, Claudius written by Robert Graves.

References

Sources

Suetonius, The Twelve Caesars
Tacitus, Annales
E. Groag, A. Stein & L. Petersen - e.a. (edd.), Prosopographia Imperii Romani saeculi I, II et III, Berlin, 1933-x, L 308. (PIR2)
Horace - Edited by O.A.W Dilke, Horace: Epistles Book I, Taylor & Francis
G. Highet, The Classical Tradition: Greek and Roman Influences on Western Literature, Oxford University Press, 1949
S.J. Harrison, Homage to Horace: A Bimillenary Celebration, Oxford University Press, 1995
G. Rickman, Roman Granaries and Store Buildings, CUP Archive, 1971
J. Hazel, Who's Who in the Roman World, Routledge, 2001
 & articles of Lollia Paullina at ancient library
Lollia Gens article at ancient library 
Marcus Lollius no. 5 article at ancient library
Quintus Volusius no.2 article at ancient library
A bit of History – Lollia Paullina
Marcus Lollius’ article at Livius.org
Lollius by D.C. O’Driscoll
Genealogy of Volusius Saturninus by D.C. O’Driscoll
Memmius Regulus by D.C. O’Driscoll
Pliny the Elder’ article at Livius.org
Romeins Imperium – Lucius Quintus Volusius Saturninus translated from Dutch to English
Romeins Imperium – Lollia Paulina translated from Dutch to English
After Actium: Two Caesars Are Not Enough: Chapter LXXXVII: The Trials of Livia Valeria

15 births
49 deaths
1st-century Roman empresses
Ancient Romans who committed suicide
Paulina
Wives of Caligula